Porropis is a genus of spiders in the family Thomisidae. It was first described in 1876 by L. Koch. , it contains 6 species.

Species
Porropis comprises the following species:
Porropis callipoda Thorell, 1881 – Australia (Queensland), New Guinea
Porropis flavifrons L. Koch, 1876 – Australia (Queensland)
Porropis homeyeri (Karsch, 1880) – Angola
Porropis nitidula Thorell, 1881 – Australia (Queensland)
Porropis poecila Kulczyński, 1911 – New Guinea
Porropis tristicula Thorell, 1881 – Australia (Queensland)

References

Thomisidae
Araneomorphae genera
Spiders of Africa
Spiders of Asia
Spiders of Australia